Confederation Trail is the name for a 470 kilometre recreational rail trail system in the Canadian province of Prince Edward Island.
It was developed in the 1990s, following the December 31, 1989, abandonment of all railway lines in the province by Canadian National Railway (CN).

Description and history

Comprising almost the total mileage of the historic Prince Edward Island Railway, development of the Confederation Trail was encouraged by a rails to trails advocacy group founded at a meeting held on August 3, 1989, in Charlottetown. Rails-to-Trails P.E.I, (now Island Trails) worked with local communities and individuals across the Island culminating in the decision by the provincial government to purchase the entire railway right-of-way from CN in 1994 after CN had removed all track. The vision of a multiuse linear park from one end of the Island to the other was embraced by the provincial government which manages operations through the Parks Division of Tourism while the Properties Section of the Department of Transportation handles all matters pertaining to the use of the trail other than public use as a biking or hiking trail.

In addition to provincial government employees, the development of the Confederation Trail was assisted by the Trans Canada Trail foundation, and by various community groups, volunteers, and Canadian Forces engineers who have volunteered in reconstructing abandoned railway bridges for recreational trail use across Canada in the past decade.

Since its completion from Tignish to Elmira in 2000, the Confederation Trail has proven a popular recreational trail for residents and tourists.  Given its railway heritage, the trail has little to no grades and is well drained.  Stone dust has been placed over the traditional railway crushed rock ballast, giving a surface suitable for walking/running, and biking.  Horses are not allowed on the trail.  The Confederation Trail remains a non-motorized trail for most of the year except during the winter when the PEI Snowmobile Association leases the trail from December 1 to March 31 each year for snowmobile use by permit holders; the Association provides grooming for snowmobiling.

The entire trail system is marked with kilometre posts and directional and interpretive signage, as well as benches, picnic table shelters, and scenic look-offs throughout.  The trail winds through Prince Edward Island's scenic agricultural and forested landscapes and is frequently crossed by public roads.

Although highly unlikely in Prince Edward Island's case, the concept of "rails to trails" is based on the premise that abandoned rail corridors should be preserved as recreational trails in order to "rail bank" these transportation arteries should the need for a future conversion back to rail usage arise.  Prince Edward Island will likely not see this occur as the connection to the North American rail network was removed on May 31, 1997, when the ferry system to the mainland that had been used for carrying rail traffic was replaced with the Confederation Bridge.

Confederation Trail is a geocaching hotspot with over 1600 geocache sites along the route.

Currently completed

 the Confederation Trail has several major routes:

Main trail 
Tignish to O'Leary (45 km easy to moderate)
O'Leary to Wellington (45 km easy to moderate)
Wellington to Hunter River (65 km moderate to hard)
Hunter River to Morell (65 km moderate to hard)
Morell to Elmira (54 km moderate)

Branch trails
Emerald to Borden-Carleton (18 km easy)
Cardigan Junction to Montague (10 km easy)
Royalty Junction to Charlottetown (8 km easy)
Mt. Stewart to Georgetown (39 km moderate)
New Harmony Junction to Souris (8 km easy)
Stratford to Murray Harbour (80 km moderate)

A large part of the railway right-of-way in the Stratford to Murray Harbour branch had been leased to local landowners in the early 1990s by CN prior to provincial ownership.  The lease expired in 2015 when full trail development began on these remaining sections, including the rebuilding of several bridges.

References

 Confederation Trail - Island Trails Coalition
 Confederation Trail - Prince Edward Island visitors guide
 Confederation Trail - official website
 Confederation Trail Map - PDF document (1.8 MB)

Rail trails in Prince Edward Island
Trans Canada Trail
Bike paths in Prince Edward Island